John Marshall Hagans (August 13, 1838June 17, 1900) was a nineteenth-century politician, lawyer and judge from Virginia and West Virginia.

Born in Brandonville, Virginia (now West Virginia), Hagans attended the public schools as a child, studied law and was admitted to the bar in 1859, commencing practice in Morgantown, Virginia (now West Virginia). He was elected prosecuting attorney for Monongalia County, West Virginia in 1862, 1863, 1864 and 1870, was law reporter for the Supreme Court of Appeals of West Virginia from 1864 to 1873 and was mayor of Morgantown, West Virginia in 1866, 1867 and 1869. Hagans was a member of the West Virginia Constitutional Convention before being elected a Republican to the United States House of Representatives in 1872, serving from 1873 to 1875, being unsuccessful for reelection. Afterwards, he was a member of the West Virginia House of Delegates from 1879 to 1883 and was elected judge of the second judicial circuit in 1888, serving until his death on June 17, 1900 in Morgantown, West Virginia. He was interred there in Oak Grove Cemetery.

External links

1838 births
1900 deaths
County prosecuting attorneys in West Virginia
Mayors of Morgantown, West Virginia
Republican Party members of the West Virginia House of Delegates
People from Preston County, West Virginia
Virginia lawyers
West Virginia lawyers
West Virginia circuit court judges
Republican Party members of the United States House of Representatives from West Virginia
19th-century American politicians
19th-century American judges
19th-century American lawyers
Burials at Oak Grove Cemetery (Morgantown, West Virginia)